Vereniging Rembrandt (Rembrandt Foundation or Rembrandt Association) is a Dutch association of art patrons who raise funds to assist Dutch museums and art galleries in purchasing artworks. Since it was founded in 1883, it has helped purchase over two thousand works, including Vermeer's The Milkmaid.

History

The 19th century saw a major exodus of Dutch art out of the country. In 1883 the 'de Vos' drawings collection came to auction, but remained out of reach of any Dutch museum's budget. A few private individuals in Amsterdam founded the Vereniging before the auction was completed and managed to help keep a large number of major drawings from the collection in the Netherlands.  Its initial aims were to fund the conservation of Dutch artworks already in the Netherlands and buying back ones from abroad, though it is no longer limited to works by Rembrandt, and other 17th century Dutch Golden Age painters.

Its current aims include helping to acquire works for public collections in the Netherlands and/or supporting acquisitions by Dutch galleries and museums. Initially the Vereniging only loaned the funds, to be repaid later by the state or by the museum or gallery itself, but later donations were given to purchase works both in the Netherlands and overseas, both Dutch and non-Dutch works. After 1945 it expanded its remit from old masters to modern art and an educational aim was added in 2002.

It began with 250 members, rising to 300 by 1907, 900 by 1983, over 12,650 by the end of 2015 and around 15,700 members by the end of 2018. Museums supported by the Vereniging give free entry to their permanent displays to its members. Its other income streams include donations, bequests, returns on its investments and since 1960 an annual contribution from the Prins Bernhard Cultuurfonds.

Selected campaigns
 1885 - Provinciaal Museum van Oudheden (now known as the Drents Museum) in Drenthe - helped to buy eight medieval fonts
 1887 - Rijksmuseum in Amsterdam - helped to purchase a silver drinking-bowl by Adam van Vianen
 1931 - Museum Boijmans Van Beuningen - The Wayfarer by Hieronymus Bosch
 1967 - Stedelijk Museum in Amsterdam - Cut-out by Henri Matisse
 1976 - Rijksmuseum - helped buy a guild cup, again by van Vianen
 2014 - Rijksmuseum - 4 million Euros to help buy a bronze bacchante by Adriaen de Vries 
 2015 - Rijksmuseum - 5 million Euros to help buy Rembrandt's marriage portraits of Marten Soolmans and Oopjen Coppit, which were ultimately bought jointly by the Rijksmuseum and the Louvre
 2019-2021 - Rijksmuseum - 15 million Euro's to help buy Rembrandt's Standard Bearer

References

External links
 

Museums in the Netherlands
Clubs and societies in the Netherlands
1883 establishments in the Netherlands
Charities based in the Netherlands
Arts foundations based in Europe
Arts organisations based in the Netherlands